American rapper and singer Travie McCoy has released two solo studio albums and twenty-four singles, including fifteen as a featured artist.

In early May 2010, McCoy released the hit single "Billionaire" with Bruno Mars, which was successful in Europe and the US. McCoy released his first solo album, Lazarus on June 8, 2010, after being in the works for a year and a half. The album debuted at number 25 on the US Billboard 200 chart with sales of 15,000 copies. On August 21, 2010 Lazarus was released in Europe and entered the UK Albums Chart at number 69. "Need You" was the second single from the album in the US, released in September 2010. "We'll Be Alright" was released on October 25, 2010, as the second single in the United Kingdom. In November 2010, McCoy collaborated with English R&B artist Taio Cruz on Cruz's single "Higher". In January 2012, McCoy collaborated with English girl group Stooshe on their single "Love Me".

Studio albums

Singles

As lead artist

As featured artist

Other appearances

Promotional singles

Guest appearances

Notes

References

Discographies of American artists
Hip hop discographies
Pop music discographies